Plagiochila laetevirens is a species of liverwort belonging to the family Plagiochilaceae. It is common as an epiphyte in the dryland forests of Guyana.

A study in tropical Ecuador found that Plagiochila laetevirens was typically not found in urban environments despite being found in a nearby pristine location, suggesting that the species is sensitive to anthropogenic effects such as the presence of wastewater and heavy metal pollution.

References

Jungermanniales
Flora of Ecuador